Bazzano Island is a small island lying off the south end of Petermann Island, between Lisboa Island and Boudet Island in the Wilhelm Archipelago. It was discovered and named by the French Antarctic Expedition, 1908–10, under Jean-Baptiste Charcot.

See also 
 List of Antarctic and sub-Antarctic islands

References
 

Islands of the Wilhelm Archipelago